In game theory, a win–win game (often called a win–win scenario) is a special case of a non-zero-sum game that produces a mutually beneficial outcome for two or more parties. If a win–win scenario is not achieved, the scenario becomes a lose–lose scenario by default, since all parties lose if the venture fails. It is also called a positive-sum game and is the opposite of a zero-sum game.

While she did not coin the term, Mary Parker Follett's process of integration described in her book Creative Experience (Longmans, Green & Co., 1924) forms the basis of what we now refer to as the idea of "win-win" conflict resolution.

See also

Abundance mentality
Game
Cooperative game
Group-dynamic game
Zero-sum game
No-win situation

References

Game theory game classes
Personal development
Negotiation
Dispute resolution
Metaphors referring to war and violence